Vitali Aleksandrovich Dyakov (born 31 January 1989) is a Russian former professional footballer.

Career
He made his professional debut in the Russian Second Division in 2007 for FC Sochi-04.

On 14 July 2017, he signed a 2-year contract with the Turkish club Sivasspor.

On 29 August 2018, he dissolved his Sivasspor contract.

On 28 February 2019, he signed with Belarusian club FC Dinamo Minsk until the end of the 2019 season.

Individual honours 
 List of 33 top players of the Russian league: #3 (2013/14).

References

External links
 
 

1989 births
Sportspeople from Krasnodar
Living people
Russian footballers
Association football defenders
Russia national football B team footballers
Russian expatriate footballers
Expatriate footballers in Turkey
Expatriate footballers in Belarus
Russian Premier League players
Belarusian Premier League players
Süper Lig players
FC Lokomotiv Moscow players
FC Rostov players
FC Dynamo Moscow players
FC Tom Tomsk players
Sivasspor footballers
FC Dinamo Minsk players
FC Spartak-2 Moscow players